Jamie Mitchell may refer to:

 Jamie Mitchell, a fictional character from the BBC soap opera Eastenders, played by Jack Ryder
 Jamie Mitchell (footballer), Scottish former footballer
 Jamie Mitchell (boxer), American boxer
 Jamie Mitchell, musician in Vengeance Rising and Scaterd Few
 Jamie Mitchell (director) of The Land Before Time XIII: The Wisdom of Friends

See also
 James Mitchell (disambiguation)